This article is about the small settlement, for the Township see Rooks Creeks Township

Rooks Creek is a small hamlet in Rooks Creek Township, Livingston County, Illinois. The hamlet is served by the Pontiac, Il mail service and shares a Pontiac address.

History 
What little that's left is a grain elevator owned by Graymont Grain Co-op since 1990, and a house. The elevator sits along the alignment of a former Illinois Central line that was closed on December 1, 1981 and removed later.

Livingston County, Illinois